Under the Eiffel Tower is a 2018 comedy film directed by Archie Borders and written by Borders, David Henry and Judith Godrèche. The film stars Matt Walsh, Judith Godrèche, Reid Scott, Michaela Watkins, David Wain, Dylan Gelula, Gary Cole, and Ary Abittan. The film premiered at the Berkshire International Film Festival on June 3, 2018. It was released on February 8, 2019, by The Orchard.

Plot
The film opens with Stuart being fired for his excessive bourbon drinking. His friend invites the depressed Stuart to join his family on a trip to Paris. Under the Eiffel Tower, 50-something Stuart proposes to 25 year-old Rosalind. She is shocked and declines, considering Stuart to be only a friend. Greatly embarrassed Stuart decides to return home.

At the airport, Stuart meets Liam and tells him the story of what happened and Liam persuades Stuart to come and travel with him by train across France. On the train Liam, a recently divorced Scotsman, and Stuart meet Louise, a French winemaker, as she sits in the train carriage with Stuart and Liam. The three depart the train and all have dinner together. Liam offers to pay for dinner but his card is declined. Stuart gives up his engagement ring to secure the bill. The two men spend the night on park benches. That day they join a tour group that happens to tour Louise's winery. The guys meet Gerard, whom Louise cares for. Stuart cooks dinner and the guys spend the night at the winery. Louise sleeps with the younger Liam, but the next day spends all her time with Stuart.

Stuart, a salesman, calls his boss and asks for his job back if he buys the French winery. He also asks his boss to mail a case of bourbon to Max to get his engagement ring released. The guys stay for Gerard's birthday party, for which Stuart cooks a lamb dinner. That night, Louise sleeps with Stuart. Everyone sees them as a perfect match. Stuart is crushed to learn Louise and Gerard are married. Liam is betrayed, and has a fistfight with Stuart. Louise also feels betrayed by Stuart's efforts to buy the vineyard. Gerard unexpectedly dies. Stuart flies home, and Louise closes the winery.

Stuart is miserable, and Louise will not return any calls. He gets on a plane and returns to France to see the woman he loves. The winery sale to Stuart's boss is completed, and he and Louise reconcile.

Cast
 Matt Walsh as Stuart 
 Judith Godrèche as Louise
 Reid Scott as Liam 
 Michaela Watkins as Tillie
 David Wain as Frank
 Dylan Gelula as Rosalind
 Gary Cole as Gerard
 Ary Abittan as Frederic

Reception
A review in The Hollywood Reporter said that Walsh "makes an unlikely but effective transition to leading man" and that the film "has a sweetness that's impossible to entirely resist". In a New York Times review the film was described as having a "dumb opening".

References

External links
 
 

2018 films
American comedy films
2018 comedy films
2010s English-language films
2010s American films